Dobriša Vas is a settlement in the Municipality of Žalec in east-central Slovenia. It lies on the left bank of the Savinja River southeast of the town of Žalec. The area is part of the traditional region of Styria. The municipality is now included in the Savinja Statistical Region.

References

External links

Dobriša Vas at Geopedia

Populated places in the Municipality of Žalec